Paul Feierstein (27 January 1903 – 5 May 1963) was a Luxembourgian footballer. He competed at the 1924 Summer Olympics and the 1928 Summer Olympics.

Managerial career
Feierstein was manager of the Luxembourg national football team, in charge for 18 games between 1933 and 1948.

References

External links

1903 births
1963 deaths
Luxembourgian footballers
Luxembourg international footballers
Luxembourgian football managers
Luxembourg national football team managers
Olympic footballers of Luxembourg
Footballers at the 1924 Summer Olympics
Footballers at the 1928 Summer Olympics
People from Differdange
Association football defenders
FA Red Boys Differdange players